

Squad information

Squad

Player statistics
Appearances for competitive matches only

|}

Topscorers

Total

Allsvenskan

Svenska Cupen

Europe

Competitions

Overall

Allsvenskan

League table

Matches

Svenska Cupen

Champions League

2nd qualifying round

Djurgården won 2 – 0 on aggregate.

3rd qualifying round

Juventus won 6 – 3 on aggregate.

UEFA Cup

UEFA Cup 1st round 

Utrecht won 4 – 3 on aggregate.

Royal League

1st group stage

The tournament continued in the 2005 season.

Friendlies

Djurgarden
Djurgårdens IF Fotboll seasons